Owen Wolff (born December 30, 2004) is an American professional soccer player who plays as a midfielder for Major League Soccer club Austin FC.

Club career
Wolff began his youth career with the academy at Columbus Crew, making four appearances for the Crew under-16 side during their 2018–19 season. He joined Atlanta United at the start of their 2019–20 season, making five appearances for their under-16 team. Wolff went on trial with Austin FC during the preseason of their inaugural season, also appearing for the club during a friendly on July 13, 2021, against Tigres UANL.

On September 9, 2021, Wolff signed a homegrown player contract with Major League Soccer side Austin FC, signing a deal through to 2025 and becoming the club's first ever homegrown player signing. He made his professional debut on November 3, 2021, appearing as an injury-time substitute during a 3–1 win over Sporting Kansas City. On May 18, 2022, Wolff earned the first start of his senior career in an away 2–1 win against LAFC.

On March 11, 2023, Wolff scored his first professional goal in a match at Real Salt Lake, making him part of the eighth father-son duo to score goals in MLS.

International career

Owen Wolff received his first national team call up with the USMNT U19 team for the June friendlies earning his first cap against Norway. He received his second call up for USMNT U19 team during the Slovenia Nation's Cup in September 2022. Getting his second USMNT U19 start against Croatia, Owen scored his first international goal before receiving his second yellow of the game and being dismissed.

Personal
Owen is the son of current Austin FC head coach Josh Wolff and the younger brother of soccer player Tyler Wolff.

Career statistics

Club

References

2004 births
Living people
American soccer players
Association football midfielders
Austin FC players
Homegrown Players (MLS)
Major League Soccer players
People from Snellville, Georgia
Soccer players from Georgia (U.S. state)
Sportspeople from the Atlanta metropolitan area
United States men's youth international soccer players
Atlanta United 2 players
American sportspeople of Filipino descent